Lovinobaňa is a village and municipality in the Lučenec District in the Banská Bystrica Region of Slovakia.

Locality

The village is located in the northern part of the County and from the Centre of this district is about Grantham, 15 miles to the North. To the West of the village passes the important path of class I ranked 50, which is a part of several major roads.

Part of the village

In 1990, was to be incorporated into a separate municipality until such time as it has a Lovinobana, which is the first written mention comes from the year 1467, and mentions it under the name Wdarnya. The local part is located about two kilometers southeast from the center of the village and Lovinobaňou is not contiguous with the intravilán.

History

In historical records the village was first mentioned in 1336.

Landmarks

In the village is the Church of St. Nicholas from the late Classicist Evangelical Church from the year 1336 1863, built on the site of a former Gothic church and the Roman Catholic Church of Virgin Mary in 1994.

Geography

The municipality lies at an altitude of 255 metres and covers and area of 21.130 km². It has a population of about 2,100 people.

References

External links
 
 

Villages and municipalities in Lučenec District